The 1852 Newfoundland general election was held in 1852 to elect members of the 5th General Assembly of Newfoundland in Newfoundland Colony. There were 9 Liberals and 6 Conservatives elected.

Results by party

Elected members
 St. John's District
 John Kent Liberal (speaker)
 Philip Francis Little Liberal
 Robert John Parsons Liberal
 Conception Bay District
 Edmund Hanrahan Liberal
 John Bemister Conservative
 John Hayward Conservative
 William Talbot
 Ferryland District
 Peter Winser
 Placentia and St. Mary's District
 Ambrose Shea Liberal
 George J. Hogsett Liberal
 Fortune Bay District
 Hugh William Hoyles Conservative
 Trinity Bay District
 Stephen March
 Bonavista Bay District
 John H. Warren Conservative
 Fogo District
 George Henry Emerson
 Burin District
 Clement Benning Liberal

References 
 

1852
1852 elections in North America
1852 elections in Canada
Pre-Confederation Newfoundland
1852 in Newfoundland